Raymond 'Ray' Carter (born 1 May 1951, Chester) is an English former footballer. He played in The Football League for Chester and Crewe Alexandra during the 1970s.

Carter progressed through Chester's youth ranks to break into the first team ranks early in the 1971–72 season at the same time as fellow homegrown talent Graham Futcher as the youth policy under Cliff Sear began to pay dividends. He spent three years involved in the first team in midfield without scoring.

In July 1974, Carter switched to Crewe Alexandra, where he played for one season before dropping into non–league football with Bangor City. Appropriately his final Football League appearance for Crewe came against Chester on the final day of the 1974–75 season, when Chester's 1–0 win at Gresty Road was ultimately enough to secure them promotion.

External links
Picture of Ray Carter in 2004
Chester team photo 1972–73 (featuring Carter)

Bibliography

References

1951 births
Sportspeople from Chester
Living people
English footballers
Association football midfielders
English Football League players
Chester City F.C. players
Crewe Alexandra F.C. players
Bangor City F.C. players